The  (CEVNI; European Code for Navigation on Inland Waterways) is the European code for rivers, canals and lakes in most of Europe.

Not all European countries use CEVNI for their inland waterways. The United Kingdom, the Nordic countries, Spain, Italy and the Balkans except Croatia have their own regulations.

CEVNI contains the core uniform rules applicable to the traffic on inland waterways, such as visual signs on vessels, sound signals and radiotelephony, waterway signs and markings, rules of the road, berthing rules, and prevention of pollution of water and disposal of waste.

See also 
 International Certificate of Competence
 International Regulations for Preventing Collisions at Sea

External links 
 CEVNI: European Code for Inland Waterways – Resolution No. 24 – Revision 5
 Eng 
 Fre 
 Rus 
 UNECE water 

Maritime education 
Water transport in Europe

navigation resolutions (including CEVNI)

References